Senator Santos may refer to:

Angel Santos (1959–2003), Senate of Guam
Francis E. Santos (fl. 1990s–2010s), Senate of Guam
Francisco R. Santos (1930–1993), Senate of Guam
Lope K. Santos (1879–1963), Senate of the Philippines
Teresita Santos (fl. 2010s), Senate of the Northern Mariana Islands